Victor Hugo Bernal (October 6, 1953 – September 2, 2006) was a Major League Baseball pitcher who played for one season. Bernal was drafted by the San Diego Padres in the 6th round of the 1975 Major League Baseball Draft. He played for the San Diego Padres for 15 games during the 1977 San Diego Padres season.

External links

1953 births
2006 deaths
Cal Poly Pomona Broncos baseball players
Major League Baseball pitchers
San Diego Padres players
Hawaii Islanders players
Baseball players from California
Amarillo Gold Sox players
Rochester Red Wings players
Walla Walla Padres players